The Leader of the Reformed Political Party is the most senior politician within the Reformed Political Party (SGP) in the Netherlands. The post is currently held by Kees van der Staaij, who succeeded Bas van der Vlies in 2010.

History
The Leaders outwardly act as the 'figurehead' and the main representative of the party. Within the party, they must ensure political consensus. At election time the Leader is always the Lijsttrekker (top candidate) of the party list. In the Reformed Political Party the Leader is always the Parliamentary leader in the House of Representatives.

See also
 Reformed Political Party

References

External links
Official

  

 
 
Reformed Political Party
Netherlands politics-related lists